Athletics competitions at the 1993 South Pacific Mini Games were held in Port Vila, Vanuatu, between December 10–16, 1993.

A total of 42 events were contested, 23 by men and 19 by women.

Medal summary
Medal winners and their results were published on the Athletics Weekly webpage courtesy of Tony Isaacs and Børre Lilloe, and on the Oceania Athletics Association webpage by Bob Snow.

Complete results can also be found on the Oceania Athletics Association, and on the Athletics PNG webpages.

Men

Women

Medal table (unofficial)

Participation (unofficial)
Athletes from the following 15 countries were reported to participate:

 
 
 
 
 
 
 
 
 
 
 
/

References

External links
Pacific Games Council
Oceania Athletics Association

Athletics at the Pacific Mini Games
Athletics in Vanuatu
South Pacific Mini Games
1993 in Vanuatuan sport
1993 Pacific Games